The Cisuralian  is the first series/epoch of the Permian. The Cisuralian was preceded by the Pennsylvanian and followed by the Guadalupian. The Cisuralian Epoch is named after the western slopes of the Ural Mountains in Russia and Kazakhstan and dates between 298.9 ± 0.15 – 272.3 ± 0.5 Mya.

The Cisuralian is often synonymous with the informal terms early Permian or lower Permian. It corresponds approximately with the Wolfcampian in southwestern North America.

The series saw the appearance of beetles and flies and was a relatively stable warming period of about 21 million years.

Name and background

The Cisuralian is the first series or epoch of the Permian. The Cisuralian was preceded by the last Pennsylvanian epoch (Gzhelian) and is followed by the Permian Guadalupian Epoch.

The name "Cisuralian" was proposed in 1982, and approved by the International Subcommission on Permian Stratigraphy in 1996.
The Cisuralian Epoch is named after the western slopes of the Ural Mountains in Russia and Kazakhstan.

Limestones on the edge of Russian Platform and make up the Ishimbay oil fields. These oil fields were vital to the Soviet Union during WW2 when the Germans controlled the oil fields to the west.

The International Chronostratigraphic Chart (v2018/07) provides a numerical age of 298.9 ± 0.15 – 272.3 ± 0.5 Mya.

The base of the Cisuralian series and the Permian system is defined as the place in the stratigraphic record where fossils of the conodont Streptognathodus isolatus first appear. The global reference profile for the base (the GSSP or golden spike) is located in the valley of the Aidaralash River, near Aqtöbe in the Ural Mountains of Kazakhstan.

Geography
Gondwana collided with Laurussia and created the Alleghenian orogeny in present-day North America. In northwestern Europe, the Hercynian orogeny continued. This created the large supercontinent,  Pangea, by the middle of the early Permian, which was to have an impact on the climate.

Climate

At the start of the Permian, the Late Palaeozoic Ice Age, which began in the Carboniferous, was at its peak. Glaciers receded over the course of the late Cisuralian as the Earth's climate gradually warmed, particularly during the Artinskian Warming Event, drying the continent's interiors. The pan-tropical belt of Pangaea experienced particularly significant aridification during this epoch.

Biodiversity
The swampy fringes were mostly ferns, seed ferns, and lycophytes.  The series saw the appearance of beetles and flies.

The coal swamps from the Carboniferous continued and the herbivores, Diadectes and Edaphosaurus.  The dry interior with small insectivores. Caseids and prototherapsid Tetraceratops made their appearance.  The marine life was probable more diverse than modern times as the climate warmed. Unusual sharks such as Helicoprion continued in this series.

Early Permian terrestrial faunas were dominated by pelycosaurs, diadectids, and amphibians,  The pelycosaurs appeared during the Late Carboniferous, and reached their apex in the Cisuralian remaining the dominant land animals for some 40 million years. A few continued into the Capitanian. They were succeeded by the therapsids.

Subdivisions

Global
 
Asselian stage (298.9 ± 0.15 – 294.6 ± 0.8 Mya)
Sakmarian stage (294.6 ± 0.8 – 290.1 ± 0.7 Mya)
Artinskian stage (290.1 ± 0.7 – 283.5 ± 0.7 Mya)
Kungurian stage (283.5 ± 0.7 – 272.3 ± 0.5 Mya)

Regional

New Zealand
Telfordian (289 – 278 Mya)
Mangapirian (278 – 270.6 Mya)

References

 
Geological epochs
01